'81–'85 is the first greatest hits album by Australian pop rock band Men at Work, released in November 1986. The album includes tracks from the band's three studio albums. The album reached number 42 on the Australian charts.

The album was re-released in 1992 as The Works and was certified platinum in Australia.

Track listing

Charts

Certifications

References 

Men at Work compilation albums
1986 greatest hits albums
Columbia Records compilation albums